Ion Goriță is a Romanian diplomat and United Nations official. He served as the Permanent Representative of Romania to the United Nations in New York from 1994 to 2000 and as President of the UNICEF Executive Board at the international level in 1996. Before his appointment as Permanent Representative to the U.N., he served as Secretary of State (Deputy Foreign Minister) in the Ministry of Foreign Affairs. He was Chairman of the Joint Inspection Unit from 2004 to 2005.

References

Chairmen and Presidents of UNICEF
Permanent Representatives of Romania to the United Nations
Romanian officials of the United Nations